Mysterious Shadows is a 1949 Austrian drama film directed by G. W. Pabst and starring Paul Hubschmid, Ilse Werner, and Elfe Gerhart. It was shown at the Venice Film Festival. It was shot at the Rosenhügel Studios in Vienna and at the Hoher Dachstein ice caves. The film's sets were designed by the art director Isabella Schlichting and Werner Schlichting

Cast
 Paul Hubschmid as Dr. Benn Wittich
 Ilse Werner as Cornelia
 Stefan Skodler as Robert Roy
 Elfe Gerhart as Charlotte
 Hermann Thimig as Heinemann
 Maria Eis as Frau Willard
 Harry Leyn as Ein Levantiner
 Ulrich Bettac as Kessler, Compagnon Roys
 Otto Schmöle as Präsident Ries
 Robert Tessen as Bobby Ries
 Helli Servi as Frl. Krümmel
 Ernst Waldbrunn as Herr Peters
 Ida Russka as Frau Peters
 Josef Fischer as Sekretär Pfeifer
 Josefine Berghofer as Sekretärin Bernhard
 Gaby Philipp as Zofe Lizzi
 Franz Eichberger as Bergführer Nino

References

Bibliography
 Rentschler, Eric. The Films of G.W. Pabst: An Extraterritorial Cinema. Rutgers University Press, 1990.

External links

1949 films
1949 drama films
Austrian drama films
1940s German-language films
Austrian black-and-white films
Films directed by G. W. Pabst
Films shot at Rosenhügel Studios